Sandy Gets Her Man is a 1940 American comedy film directed by Otis Garrett and Paul Gerard Smith and written by Sy Bartlett and Jane Storm. The film stars Baby Sandy, Stuart Erwin, Una Merkel, Edgar Kennedy, William Frawley, Edward Brophy, Wally Vernon, Jack Carson and William B. Davidson. The film was released on November 8, 1940, by Universal Pictures.

Plot

Cast        
Baby Sandy as Sandy
Stuart Erwin as Bill Carey
Una Merkel as Nan Clark
Edgar Kennedy as Fire Chief Galvin
William Frawley as Police Chief J. A. O'Hara
Edward Brophy as Junior
Wally Vernon as Bagshaw
Jack Carson as Tom Gerrity
William B. Davidson as Councilman Charles J. Clark 
John Sheehan as Justice of the Peace
Isabel Randolph as Myrtle
Lillian Yarbo as Hattie, the Maid (uncredited)

References

External links
 

1940 films
American comedy films
1940 comedy films
Universal Pictures films
American black-and-white films
Films directed by Otis Garrett
1940s English-language films
1940s American films